San Juan de Piñera is one of nine parishes (administrative divisions) in the Cudillero municipality, within the province and autonomous community of Asturias, in northern Spain.

Villages
 Arroxas
 Belandres
 La Cuesta'l Cestu
 El Mantu
 Outeiru
 El Penéu
 El Rellayu
 Villamar
 Los Villazones
 El Zreicéu

References

Parishes in Cudillero